Starchenko is a Ukrainian surname. Notable people with the surname include:

 Denys Starchenko (born 1994), Ukrainian footballer
 Roman Starchenko (born 1986), Kazakhstani ice hockey player
 Sergei Starchenko, mathematician

See also
 

Ukrainian-language surnames